Just Like a Woman is a 1912 silent short film directed by D. W. Griffith and starring Mary Pickford. It was produced by the Biograph Company and distributed by General Film Company.

It is preserved from a paper print source by the Library of Congress.

Cast
Mary Pickford - The Young Woman
Grace Henderson - Young Woman's Mother
Harry Hyde - The Fortune Hunter
J. Jiquel Lanoe - the Broker
Wilfred Lucas - The Wealthy Friend
Robert Harron - The Stableboy
Kate Bruce - The Maid

unbilled
Kathleen Butler - Servant
Christy Cabanne - In Club
Hector Dion - An Oil Man
Charles Hill Mailes - Oil Man
Mae Marsh - In Club scene
Marguerite Marsh - In Club scene
Frank Opperman - Oil Man

See also
Mary Pickford filmography

References

External links
 Just Like a Woman at IMDb.com

1912 films
American silent short films
American black-and-white films
Biograph Company films
Films directed by D. W. Griffith
American romance films
1910s romance films
1910s American films